Robert Wierzel (born July 1, 1956) is an American lighting designer.

 
Mr. Wierzel has worked with artists, directors and designers from diverse disciplines and backgrounds in theatre, dance, contemporary music, museums and opera on stages throughout the United States and abroad. 
He has a long collaboration (34 years) with choreographer & director Bill T. Jones and the Bill T. Jones/Arnie Zane Company (several Bessie Awards, along with productions at the Lyon Opera Ballet and Berlin Opera Ballet). Mr. Wierzel is also well known for his extensive work in the American regional theatre.

Mr. Wierzel's work has been seen with the following companies: Glimmerglass Festival, New York City Opera, Boston Lyric Opera, Canadian Opera Company, Chicago Opera Theater, Florida Grand Opera, Folk Opera of Sweden, Gotham Chamber Opera, Houston Grand Opera, Lincoln Center Great Performances, Lyric Opera of Chicago, L'Operade of Montreal, Manhattan School of Music, Minnesota Opera, Nashville Opera, Opera Cleveland, Opera Columbus, Opera Omaha, Pittsburgh Opera, Portland Opera, San Diego Opera, San Francisco Opera, Seattle Opera, Tokyo Opera, Utah Opera and Symphony, Vancouver Opera, Virginia Opera, Washington Opera, Doug Varone and Dancers, Donna Uchizono Dance Company, Trisha Brown Dance Company, Sean Curran Dance Company, Dayton Contemporary Dance Company, Diversions Dance Company, Alonzo's King's Ballet, Lyon Opera Ballet, Larry Goldhuber Dance, Boston Ballet, London Contemporary Dance Theatre, Berlin Opera Ballet, Milwaukee Ballet, Hubbard Street Dance Company, Connecticut Ballet, Paul Hall Contemporary Dance Theatre, Alliance Theatre Company, A Contemporary Theatre of Seattle, Actor's Theatre of Louisville, A.C.T. American Conservatory Theater, Alley Theatre, A.R.T. American Repertory Theater, Arena Stage, Asolo Repertory Theatre, Berkeley Repertory Theatre, California Shakespeare Festival, Center Stage, Center Theatre Group Los Angeles, Chicago Shakespeare Theatre, Minneapolis Children's Theatre Company, Cincinnati Playhouse, Cleveland Play House, Dallas Theatre Center, Delaware Theatre Company, Georgestreet Playhouse, Geva Theatre, The Goodman Theatre, The Guthrie Theatre, Hartford Stage Company, Huntington Theatre Company, Indiana Repertory Theatre Company, Long Wharf Theatre, Los Angeles Theatre, The Magic Theatre, McCarter Theatre, Merrimack Theatre Company, Milwaukee Repertory Theater, New Mexico Repertory Theatre, Old Globe Theatre, People's Light and Theatre Company, Philadelphia Theatre Company, Pittsburgh City Theatre, Playmakers Repertory Theatre, Portland Stage Company, Royal Alexander Theatre, Toronto, Canada, St. Louis Repertory Theater, Santa Fe Stages, Shakespeare Theater Washington D.C., Signature Theatre Company, Syracuse Stage, Virginia Stage Company, Westport Country Playhouse, and Yale Repertory Theater.

Robert Wierzel is a multiple award winner. He has earned the Primetime Emmy Award, Obie Award, and Bessie Award along with several nominations for his work including multiple Audelco Award nominations, Joseph Jefferson Award nomination, Barrymore Award nomination, Helen Hayes Design Award nomination, and LA Theatre Ovation Award. In 1991 Mr. Wierzel was the recipient of the American Theatre Wing Lighting Design Award for his work with Philip Glass on Hydrogen Jukebox. His work on "Fela!" earned him a Tony nomination (Best Lighting Design in a Musical) in 2010.

He teaches in the graduate lighting design program at New York University  Tisch School of the Arts  Department of Design for Stage and Film.

External links 

Department of Design for Stage and Film Bio 

American lighting designers
1956 births
Living people
New York University faculty
Yale School of Drama alumni